So Real is the debut studio album by American singer Mandy Moore.  The album was released on December 7, 1999, in the United States by Epic Records. The album was released at a critical turning point in pop music - known as the teen pop revival - which saw other teen artists such as Britney Spears, Christina Aguilera and Jessica Simpson release their debut albums that same year to commercial and critical success. Conceptually, the album addresses themes such as teenage love, romance and heartbreak, all of which were common subjects in teen pop music at the time. 

So Real became a moderate hit in the United States, reaching a peak of 31 on the Billboard 200 albums chart, as well as being certified Platinum by the RIAA, for shipments of over 1 million. The album spawned a top 50 hit with "Candy" and went gold within three months in the RIAA.

Five months following the release of So Real, it was reissued as I Wanna Be with You, which also served as Moore's debut album internationally.

Singles
"Candy" was released as Moore' debut single on August 17, 1999. The song received generally favorable critical reviews from critics, mostly praising its composition. It performed moderately well on the Billboard Hot 100, peaking just outside the top 40 at #41. It entered the chart on #88 and reached its peak in its eighth week on the chart. It received more success abroad, peaking at #6 in the UK and #2 in Australia. The music video, which was directed by Chris Robinson, had a cameo by the girl group PYT.

"Walk Me Home" was released on December 6, 1999 as the second single in the US; the song failed to chart when it was first released. In October 2000, the song was re-released to promote I Wanna Be with You and peaked at #38 on the Billboard Pop 100 chart.

Reception

Reviews among music critics were generally mixed. Said William Ruhlmann of AllMusic, "fifteen-year-old Mandy Moore's debut album sounded like it was inspired almost entirely by listening to recent hit albums by 'N Sync, the Backstreet Boys, and Britney Spears," citing stylistic similarities between album tracks "So Real" and "Let Me Be the One" to the Backstreet Boys' "Backstreet's Back", and saying that Moore's "occasional growls" were similar to Spears' "...Baby One More Time". Ruhlmann stated that Moore could "carry a tune", but "with no particular distinction", saying that aside from her singing, the music was "mediocre". Stephanie Mcgrath from the Canadian publication Jam! compared the album to the work of Britney Spears and Jessica Simpson; she also labeled the material as "a mediocre collection that could fade quickly unless "Candy" continues to catch on with young pop fanatics". Overall, she stated, "If female pop is what you crave, opt for Jessica Simpson or Britney Spears".

Commercial performance
In the United States, So Real had moderate success debuting at number 71 on the US Billboard 200, significantly lower than expected by Epic Records, but later it managed to climb at the top fourty at number 31 on the chart due to promotions. The album spent a total of 23 weeks on the US Billboard 200 chart. It ranked at 116 on the year end chart of Billboard 200. The first single from the album "Candy" was not a major hit, as it peaked just outside the top 40 at number 41 on the US Billboard Hot 100 and debuted on the charts in thirteen countries, and was certified Gold in the US. The second single "Walk Me Home" did not manage to enter the Hot 100 but it charted on the US Pop Airplay chart. So Real was certified RIAA Platinum in the US after four months with 1 million copies sold.

Track listing

Personnel
Credits for So Real adapted from Allmusic.

 Mandy Moore – primary artist
 Tony Battaglia – composer
 Dakari – guest artist
 Shaun Fisher – composer
 Jive – guest artist
 Billy Lawrence – guest artist
 T. Moran – composer
 David Rice – composer
 Mark Stevens – composer

Charts

Weekly charts

Year-end charts

Certifications

References

1999 debut albums
Mandy Moore albums
Epic Records albums
Contemporary R&B albums by American artists
Bubblegum pop albums